This needs more info
Carlos Alberto Madero Erazo is the Honduras Minister of Labor and Social Security.

References

Living people
Government ministers of Honduras
Year of birth missing (living people)
Place of birth missing (living people)